Água de Mar is a Portuguese television series that premiered on 14 July 2014 on RTP1. It stars Jorge Corrula, Mariana Monteiro and Rui Santos.

Cast
Jorge Corrula
Mariana Monteiro
Rui Santos

References

2014 Portuguese television series debuts
Rádio e Televisão de Portugal original programming
2010s Portuguese television series